Psalm 63 is the 63rd psalm of the Book of Psalms, beginning in English in the King James Version: "O God, thou art my God; early will I seek thee". In the slightly different numbering system of the Greek Septuagint version of the Bible and the Latin Vulgate, this psalm is Psalm 62. In Latin, it is known as "Deus Deus meus". It is attributed to King David, set when he was in the wilderness of Judah, and its theme concerns being stranded in the wilderness away from one's family.

The psalm forms a regular part of Jewish, Catholic, Lutheran, Anglican and other Protestant liturgies. It has been set to music.

Text

Hebrew Bible version 
The following is the Hebrew text of Psalm 63:

King James Version 
 O God, thou art my God; early will I seek thee: my soul thirsteth for thee, my flesh longeth for thee in a dry and thirsty land, where no water is;
 To see thy power and thy glory, so as I have seen thee in the sanctuary.
 Because thy lovingkindness is better than life, my lips shall praise thee.
 Thus will I bless thee while I live: I will lift up my hands in thy name.
 My soul shall be satisfied as with marrow and fatness; and my mouth shall praise thee with joyful lips:
 When I remember thee upon my bed, and meditate on thee in the night watches.
 Because thou hast been my help, therefore in the shadow of thy wings will I rejoice.
 My soul followeth hard after thee: thy right hand upholdeth me.
 But those that seek my soul, to destroy it, shall go into the lower parts of the earth.
 They shall fall by the sword: they shall be a portion for foxes.
 But the king shall rejoice in God; every one that sweareth by him shall glory: but the mouth of them that speak lies shall be stopped.

Theme
The Psalm is composed of two parts: first (verses 1–8) an address to God:
O God, You are my God; Early will I seek You.

Secondly, the psalmist's wishes of vengeance are then formulated in the third person in the last three verses.

The first part, more developed, evokes desire, praise and then trust in God. The image of the arid earth in verse 1 does not express the absence of God as in other psalms, but rather the aspiration to meet. Confidence is then expressed by the symbolism of the protective bird. Perhaps also the wings recall the wings of the kerubim on the ark of the covenant, these representing the Lord.

The change is evident in verse 10. There is now talk of vengeance towards the enemies of the psalmist, and some may evade this disconcerting psalm end. It is a question of a king in the last verse. Perhaps it is the psalmist himself, or a way of extending his prayer to the community. There is such a cry of vengeance in the Book of Jeremiah 11:20.

Heading
Biblical commentator Cyril Rodd notes that the phrase "'When he was in the Wilderness of Judah' may refer to David's flight from Absalom, but the time when Saul was pursuing David has also been suggested".

Verse 10
They shall fall by the sword: they shall be a portion for foxes.
Other translations refer to jackals rather than foxes. "It is the jackal rather than the fox which preys on dead bodies, and which assembles in troops on the battle-fields, to feast on the slain."

Uses

Early Church
The ancient church up to about 400 AD had the practice of beginning the singing of the Psalms at each Sunday service with Psalm 63, called "the morning hymn". John Chrysostom wrote that "it was decreed and ordained by the primitive [church] fathers, that no day should pass without the public singing of this Psalm". He also observed that "the spirit and soul of the whole Book of Psalms is contracted into this Psalm".

Catholicism
This psalm was already chosen by St Benedict of Nursia around 530, as the fourth and last psalm during the solemn office at the Sunday laudes (Rule of St. Benedict, chapter XI).

Psalm 63 is still recited every Sunday at the Lauds by priests and religious communities, according to the liturgy of the Hours. In the triennial cycle of the Sunday Mass, it is read on the 22nd and 32nd Sundays of the ordinary time of the year A, and the 12th Sunday of the ordinary time of the year C.

Book of Common Prayer
In the Church of England's Book of Common Prayer, this psalm is appointed to be read on the morning of the 12th day of the month.

Music
Heinrich Schütz set the psalm in a metred version in German, "O Gott, du mein getreuer Gott", SWV 160, as part of the Becker Psalter, first published in 1628. At the end of the 17th century, Michel-Richard de Lalande wrote a work in Latin according to this psalm (S.20). It is one of the great motets to celebrate the services at the royal chapel of the Château de Versailles, for the Sun King Louis XIV.

Czech composer Antonín Dvořák set part of Psalm 63 (together with part of Psalm 61) as No. 6 of his Biblical Songs in 1894.

References

External links 

 
 
  in Hebrew and English - Mechon-mamre
 Text of Psalm 63 according to the 1928 Psalter
 A psalm of David, when he was in the wilderness of Judah. O God, you are my God — it is you I seek! text and footnotes, usccb.org United States Conference of Catholic Bishops
 Psalm 63 – Love Better than Life text and detailed commentary, enduringword.com
 Psalm 63:1 introduction and text, biblestudytools.com
 Psalm 63 / Refrain: My soul is athirst for God, even for the living God. Church of England
 Psalm 63 at biblegateway.com
 Hymns for Psalm 63 hymnary.org

063
Works attributed to David